The Texas A&M Aggies softball team represents Texas A&M University in NCAA Division I college softball. The team belongs to the SEC Conference and plays home games at the Davis Diamond.The Aggies have won two NCAA championships in 1983 and 1987 along with an AIAW national championship in 1982. The Aggies have been NCAA runners-up three times in 1984, 1986, and  2008. Reaching the Women's College World Series eleven times, the Aggies have reached the finals six times in 1982, 1983, 1984, 1986, 1987, and 2008.

Head coaches
The following people have served as head coaches at Texas A&M.
Mildred Little 1973
Toby Crown 1974
Kay Don 1974–1976
Diane Quitta 1977
Diane Justice/Don Smith 1978
Bill Galloway 1979–1980
Bob Brock 1981–1996
Jo Evans 1997–2022
Trisha Ford 2022–

Notable players

National awards
NFCA Golden Shoe Award
Sharonda McDonald - 2005

Conference awards
Big 12 Player of the Year
Kendall Richards (1996)
Selena Collins (2002)
Amanda Scarborough (2005)
Megan Gibson (2008)

Big 12 Pitcher of the Year
Jessica Kapchinski (2004)
Amanda Scarborough (2007)

Big 12 Freshman of the Year
Sharonda McDonald (2004)
Amanda Scarborough (2005)

Big 12 Defensive Player of the Year
Natalie Villarreal (2009, 2011)

Big 12 Coach of the Year
Jo Evans (2004, 2005, 2008)

Louisville Slugger/NFCA All-Americans

See also

List of NCAA Division I softball programs

References

External links

 

 
Sports teams in Texas